The Love Your Shorts Film Festival is a film festival held in Sanford, Florida, around Valentine's Day. The Festival screens only short films under 30 minutes in length. Films are divided into different blocks for screening. Audience members at each block vote for their favorite film and winners are announced on the spot. The winning films from each block advance to a final block for a panel of judges to pick the overall festival winner. Winners of each block earn the festival's award, the "Monroe", an original piece of metal artwork named after Sanford's Lake Monroe. At the end of each block a brief Q&A session is conducted between the filmmakers and audience members. The Festival hosts an hour-long moderated filmmakers panel in which movie techniques and filmmaker triumphs and tribulations are discussed.

2011 Festival

General Information 
The 2011 Love Your Shorts Film Festival was held at the Greater Sanford Regional Chamber of Commerce, which used to be a USO headquarters. The dates of the festival were February 11–13, 2011. There were over 220 movies submitted from 15 countries, of which, 63 were selected for screening.

Winners

Judges Panel 
 Denise Cummings
 Barbara Farrell
 Tracy Frenkel
 Lisa Mills
 Roger Moore

2012 Festival

General Information 
The 2012 Love Your Shorts Film Festival was held at the historic Ritz Theater / Wayne Densch Performing Arts Center on February 10–12, 2012. The theater was established in 1922 and has a seating capacity of 585. Film submissions were accepted from June 1, 2011, through November 30, 2011 via Withoutabox.

References

 Hurter, Tom. "Love Your Shorts Film Festival Official Selections Announced", UCF Film News, January 10, 2011.
 Myer, Ray. "Movies selected for inaugural Love Your Shorts Film Festival", The Sanford Herald, January 12, 2011.
 Myer, Ray. "Roll out the red carpet – Love Your Shorts is here", The Sanford Herald, February 7, 2011.
 Moore, Roger. "Sanford's first film fest debuts Friday", The Orlando Sentinel, February 10, 2011.
 Moore, Roger. "Love Your Shorts Film Fest is a wrap, and a success, in Sanford ", The Orlando Sentinel, February 14, 2011.
 Myer, Ray. "IT'S A WRAP: Love Your Shorts premieres in Sanford", The Sanford Herald, February 17, 2011.
 Moore, Roger. "Love Your Shorts Film Festival moves to bigger digs", The Orlando Sentinel, June 2, 2011.

External links
 Love Your Shorts Film Festival Official website
 Wayne Densch Performing Arts Center Official website

2011 establishments in Florida
Film festivals in Florida
Film festivals established in 2011
Tourist attractions in Seminole County, Florida
Short film festivals in the United States